As Shadows Burn is the 2nd studio album by the band Echoes of Eternity, released by Nuclear Blast on September 22, 2009 in the US and by Massacre Records on September 25, 2009 in Europe.

Track listing 

 "Ten of Swords" - 3:55
 "A Veiled Horizon" (Duane Cowan) - 3:34
 "Memories of Blood and Gold" - 3:46
 "The Scarlet Embrace" (Brandon Patton) - 5:18
 "Descent of a Blackened Soul" - 4:10
 "Twilight Fires" - 4:08
 "Buried Beneath a Thousand Dreams" (Brandon Patton) - 4:19
 "Letalis Deus" - 3:33
 "Funeral in the Sky" (Brandon Patton, Duane Cowan, Bryan Eagle, Kirk Carrison, Cliff Carrison/Instrumental) - 7:12

 All songs written by Francine Boucher except where noted

Personnel 

 Francine Boucher - Vocals
 Brandon Patton - Guitars
 Bryan Eagle - Guitars
 Duane Cowan - Bass
 Kirk Carrison - Drums

References 

2009 albums
Nuclear Blast albums
Echoes of Eternity albums
Albums produced by Logan Mader